This is a list of Grand Prix motorcycle racers whose last names start with the letter V.

V
  Chris Vermeulen
  Pierrot Vervroegen
  Walter Villa
  Isaac Viñales
  Maverick Viñales
  Arnaud Vincent
  Jan de Vries
  Jason Vincent

 V